Rozman is a both a given name and surname. Notable people with the surname include:

Franc Rozman (nom de guerre Stane), (1911–1944), Slovenian Yugoslav Partisan of World War II
Gregorij Rožman (1883–1959), Bishop of Ljubljana
Ivana Rožman (born 1989), Macedonian athlete
Matjaž Rozman (born 1987), Slovenian soccer player
Rok Rozman (born 1988), Slovenian rower
Levy Rozman (born 1995), known online as GothamChess, American chess coach and chess International Master
Rozman Jusoh, Malaysian drug trafficker

See also
Rosman (disambiguation)
Rossmann (disambiguation)

Slovene-language surnames